LMS diesel shunter 7058 was based on an earlier Armstrong Whitworth prototype of 1932, which had been tested by the London, Midland and Scottish Railway.  It was initially numbered 7408 and then re-numbered 7058.

War Department use
It was loaned to the War Department between 1941 and 1943 for use at the Longmoor Military Railway, but, despite the extensive period of time spent on loan, no WD number was allocated.

Post-war use
It passed to British Railways upon nationalisation in January 1948, which allocated it number 13000. However, it was withdrawn in November 1949 (and scrapped shortly afterwards) before the number had been applied. The number 13000 was then used instead for the first of the Class 08 shunters.

See also
 LMS diesel shunters

References

7058
Diesel shunter 7058
War Department locomotives
Armstrong Whitworth locomotives
C locomotives
Railway locomotives introduced in 1934
Standard gauge locomotives of Great Britain
Scrapped locomotives
Individual locomotives of Great Britain
Unique locomotives
Diesel-electric locomotives of Great Britain